Calligrapha californica is a species of beetles in the subfamily Chrysomelinae (a subfamily of leaf beetles or Chrysomelidae). It is found in the United States and Canada.

References

External links 
 Images of Calligrapha californica at BugGuide.net

 
 
 Calligrapha californica at insectoid.info

Beetles described in 1896
Chrysomelinae